Xu Xurong (23 April 1922 – 12 July 2022) was a Chinese physicist, and an academician of the Chinese Academy of Sciences. He was a delegate to the 12th National People's Congress.

Biography
Xu was born in Linyi County (now Linyi), Shandong, on 23 April 1922. He attended Confucius Temple School. After the outbreak of the Second Sino-Japanese War, he escaped to central China's Hubei province, where he studied at Yunyang National Shandong Middle School, then fled to southwest China's Sichuan province, and studied in Mianyang National No. 6 High School (now Mianyang Nanshan High School). In 1941, he was admitted to National Southwestern Associated University, majoring in physics. After graduating in 1945, he became an assistant at Peking University and was a graduate student under the supervision of Rao Yutai. In 1950, he was transferred to the Institute of Physics of the Chinese Academy of Sciences to engage in solid-state luminescence research. One year later, he was sent to study at the Lebedev Physical Institute, earning his vice-doctorate degree in 1955.

In September 1965, adjusted by the Chinese Academy of Sciences, Changchun Institute of Optics, Fine Mechanics and Physics was established with luminescence as its main research direction. In 1966, Xu was assigned to the institute, where he was promoted to director in 1978 and honorary director after 1985. In 1980, Xu, together with Xu Shaohong, Wu Boxuan and others, jointly founded the Luminescence Branch Society of the Chinese Physical Society and served as its first president. In 1987, he moved to Tianjin Institute of Technology (now Tianjin University of Technology), where he established the Institute of Material Physics as director. In 1997, he joined the faculty of Northern Jiaotong University (now Beijing Jiaotong University) and established the research base of Luminescence, the Institute of Optoelectronic Technology.

On 12 July 2022, Xu died from an illness in Beijing, at the age of 100.

Honours and awards
 1980 Member of the Chinese Academy of Sciences (CAS)
 1999 Science and Technology Progress Award of the Ho Leung Ho Lee Foundation

References

1922 births
2022 deaths
People from Linyi
Physicists from Shandong
National Southwestern Associated University alumni
Academic staff of Tianjin University of Technology
Academic staff of Beijing Jiaotong University
Delegates to the 12th National People's Congress
Members of the Chinese Academy of Sciences
Chinese centenarians
Men centenarians